Louie Anne Batley (born in Chorley, Lancashire) is an English actress, singer, and dancer best known for her role in Hollyoaks as Sarah Barnes.

Early life
Louie Anne Batley was born in Chorley, Lancashire, England on 9 June 1987. She attended Rivington Primary School and Westholme Upper School in 1998 to 1999, but left due to dance commitments.

Career
Batley had minor roles prior to her role in Hollyoaks, including a part as Angus Deayton's young girlfriend Natalie in the second series of Julia Davis' award-winning black comedy Nighty Night.

Batley played the role of Sarah Barnes on Channel 4 soap opera Hollyoaks from 2005 until 2009.

Batley was due to appear in the second series of the BBC show Just the Two of Us, but was dropped after her professional singing partner Russell Watson quit the show due to health problems. She also performed the opening song on 2007's BBC Children in Need, along with co-stars Kevin Sacre, Gerard McCarthy and Summer Strallen.

Batley was once a singer in the band Verity.

Television
{| class="wikitable"
|-
! Year !! Show !! Role
|-
| 1995 || Jake's Progress || Portia
|-
| 2005 || Nighty Night || Natalie
|-
| 2005–2009 || Hollyoaks || rowspan=2|Sarah Barnes
|-
| 2008–2009 || Hollyoaks Later 
|}

Movies

Other

Theatre

Modelling

Awards
 Won
 British Freestyle Champion
 Lyrical Section
 European Theatrical Stage Dance1st Place
 Carlton TV – Britain's Best Dancer2003
 Nominated
 IDTA Tap & Ballet Awards
 Le Classique de Danse Awards
 Representative
 NATD in the Grand Finals

Personal life

Batley and Simon Lawson, who played Simon Crosby in Hollyoaks'', have set up an acting workshop for up and coming talent. In 2009 they took on the lease of a public house, the Princess Victoria, in London's Earls Court Road. It was announced via Verity and Violet's Twitter account that Batley and Lawson had got married in July 2013. She gave birth to the couple's first child in January 2019. On 4 October 2020, Batley announced that she was pregnant with her second child.

Her brother, Tobias Batley, is a professional ballet dancer.

References

External links

Loui Batley's agency

1987 births
Living people
English soap opera actresses
English television actresses
People from Chorley
Actresses from Lancashire